Gonçalo Rosa Gonçalves Pereira Rodrigues (born 18 July 1997), known as Guga, is a Portuguese professional footballer who plays for Rio Ave F.C. as a midfielder.

Club career

Benfica
Born in Faro, Algarve, Guga started his career at local club Lusitano FC in 2005, before joining S.L. Benfica's youth system at the age of 11. He made his professional debut with the latter's reserves on 13 August 2016, as a late substitute in a 2–0 away loss against Varzim S.C. in the LigaPro.

On 9 January 2019, Guga joined Panetolikos F.C. of the Super League Greece on a six-month loan deal with the option for an additional year.

Famalicão
On 26 June 2019, Guga signed a five-year contract with F.C. Famalicão. His Primeira Liga bow took place on 10 August, when he started and finished the 2–0 away win over C.D. Santa Clara. He scored his first goal on 14 September, the second of a 4–2 home victory against F.C. Paços de Ferreira.

Rio Ave
Guga joined Rio Ave F.C. on 14 January 2021, on a deal until June 2024. He played 20 matches until the end of the season, in an eventual relegation from the top division.

References

External links

1997 births
Living people
People from Faro, Portugal
Sportspeople from Faro District
Portuguese footballers
Association football midfielders
Primeira Liga players
Liga Portugal 2 players
S.L. Benfica B players
F.C. Famalicão players
Rio Ave F.C. players
Super League Greece players
Panetolikos F.C. players
Portugal youth international footballers
Portuguese expatriate footballers
Expatriate footballers in Greece
Portuguese expatriate sportspeople in Greece